Thomas Franklin Green (8 February 1927 – 20 December 2006) was an American educational theorist and philosopher.

Biography
Born on 8 February 1927, Thomas Franklin Green was raised in Lincoln, Nebraska. His parents worked as a civil engineer and writer. He studied political science and philosophy at the University of Nebraska, graduating in 1948. Green elected to pursue a master's degree in philosophy, which he finished in 1949, at Nebraska. He subsequently earned a doctorate from Cornell University. Green began teaching at the South Dakota School of Mines and Technology, and furthered his career at Michigan State University prior to joining Syracuse University in 1964. Four years later, he was awarded a Guggenheim fellowship. Green was appointed Margaret O. Slocum Professor of Education in 1980, and retired from Syracuse in 1993. He died in Jamesville, New York, at the age of 79 on 20 December 2006.

References

1927 births
2006 deaths
American educational theorists
Philosophers of education
20th-century American philosophers
Michigan State University faculty
Cornell University alumni
University of Nebraska–Lincoln alumni
Syracuse University faculty
South Dakota School of Mines and Technology faculty
People from Lincoln, Nebraska